Undheim Church is a parish church of the Church of Norway in Time Municipality in Rogaland county, Norway. It is located in the village of Undheim. It is the church for the Undheim parish which is part of the Jæren prosti (deanery) in the Diocese of Stavanger. The white, concrete church was built in a long church style in 2001 using designs by the architecture firm: Link Arkitektur. The church seats about 256 people.

History
The original Undheim Church was built in 1921 in a long church style by the architect Halvorsen. That church was built of wood and it had about 260 seats. That church caught fire and burned down on 10 July 1998. Its replacement was completed in 2001. The new church lies slightly to the north of where the old one was located. The new church was consecrated on 9 December 2001.

See also
List of churches in Rogaland

References

Time, Norway
Churches in Rogaland
21st-century Church of Norway church buildings
Churches completed in 2001
1921 establishments in Norway